Ísak Bergmann Jóhannesson (born 23 March 2003) is an Icelandic professional footballer who plays as a midfielder for F.C. Copenhagen and the Iceland national team.

Club career

ÍA
Having been born outside of Iceland, while his father Jóhannes Karl Guðjónsson was playing for Aston Villa, Ísak started his career with local family club ÍA in Akranes in Iceland. In 2017 he went on trial with both Ajax and Brighton & Hove Albion. In 2018 he played his first senior game with ÍA, aged 15, in the Icelandic second tier, with his father managing ÍA at the time. Later that year he agreed a move to IFK Norrköping in Sweden, though the transfer didn't go through until 2019.

IFK Norrköping
Ísak made his Norrköping debut in the Swedish Cup on 21 August 2019, starting and scoring against IFK Timrå. He made his Allsvenskan debut on 26 September 2019, aged 16, coming on as a substitute against AFC Eskilstuna. Before the Swedish 2020 season, he was named the most promising player in the league. He was in the starting line-up for Norrköping for most of the season. In October 2020 he was named one of the 60 most promising players in the world, born in 2003, by British paper The Guardian.

Copenhagen
On 1 September 2021, Ísak joined Danish Superliga club F.C. Copenhagen on a deal until June 2026.

International career
Ísak has featured for Iceland at under-16, under-17, under-19 and under-21 level. In November 2020 he was called up to the senior squad for UEFA Nations League match against England. He made his debut in that match at the age of 17 years and 240 days, becoming the fifth youngest player to debut for the Icelandic national team. He only became the third youngest player from Akranes to debut for the national team, as Akranes is the home town of four of the six youngest players to debut for the national team.

Personal life
Ísak was born in England on 23 March 2003, to his parents, former international Jóhannes Karl Guðjónsson, known as Joey Guðjónsson who is currently the assistant manager of the Icelandic national football team and his mother Jófríður María Guðlaugsdóttir who works in Akranes's high school, Fjölbrautaskóli Vesturlands. Ísak also has three younger brothers called Jóel Thor  (2005), Daniel Ingi (2007) and Emil Karl (2010). His maternal cousin is Oliver Stefánsson, who is also contracted to Norrköping. His paternal grandfather is manager Guðjón Þórðarson. His paternal uncles are Bjarni Guðjónsson, Þórður Guðjónsson and Björn Bergmann Sigurðarson. His maternal aunt is Magnea Guðlaugsdóttir. His father, grandfather, aunt and uncles have all won senior caps for Iceland. In addition his grandfather managed the senior side.

Career statistics

Club

International 

 Scores and results list Iceland's goal tally first, score column indicates score after each Ísak goal.

Honours
Copenhagen
 Danish Superliga: 2021–22

International
Baltic Cup: 2022

References

External links 

2003 births
Living people
Isak Bergmann Johannesson
Isak Bergmann Johannesson
Isak Bergmann Johannesson
Isak Bergmann Johannesson
Isak Bergmann Johannesson
English footballers
Isak Bergmann Johannesson
Association football midfielders
Isak Bergmann Johannesson
IFK Norrköping players
F.C. Copenhagen players
Allsvenskan players
Isak Bergmann Johannesson
Isak Bergmann Johannesson
Expatriate footballers in Sweden
Expatriate men's footballers in Denmark